The Duchy of Brunswick-Lüneburg and the United States began relations in 1848 with mutual recognition but both countries never established formal relations. Relations continued in 1867 when the Duchy joined the North German Confederation. Relations would eventually end with World War I when the U.S. declared war on Germany.

History
On April 5, 1848, Secretary of State James Buchanan acknowledged the Consul-General of Brunswick and Lüneburg in New York City as John Dreyer Esq., which constitutes the first known act of mutual recognition between the United States and the Duchy of Brunswick and Lüneburg. The U.S. in return opened its first consulate in the Duchy of Brunswick and Lüneburg on March 17, 1856. The consulate would close on July 25, 1916.

On August 21, 1854, the U.S. Secretary of State William L. Marcy and the Consul of the Duke of Brunswick and Lüneburg at Mobile, Ala., Dr. Julius Samson, signed a Convention Respecting the Disposition of Property, as they were "animated by the desire to secure and extend, by an amicable convention, the relations happily existing between the two countries." The treaty was negotiated and signed in Washington, D.C..

The Duchy of Brunswick and Lüneburg joined the North German Confederation in 1867, to which the U.S. appointed George Bancroft, then U.S. Minister to the Kingdom of Prussia, to serve as the U.S. Minister to the North German Confederation. From this point forward, foreign policy of the North German Confederation, and later, after 1871 the German Empire, was made in Berlin, with the German Kaiser (who was also the King of Prussia) accrediting ambassadors of foreign nations. On April 6, 1917, Wilson declared war on Imperial Germany.

See also

 Foreign relations of the United States
 Germany–United States relations
 Grand Duchy of Baden–United States relations
 Kingdom of Bavaria–United States relations
 Kingdom of Hanover–United States relations
 German Empire–United States relations
 Hanseatic Republics–United States relations
 Grand Duchy of Hesse–United States relations
 Grand Duchy of Mecklenburg-Schwerin–United States relations
 Grand Duchy of Mecklenburg-Strelitz–United States relations
 Duchy of Nassau–United States relations
 North German Confederation–United States relations
 Grand Duchy of Oldenburg–United States relations
 Principality of Schaumburg-Lippe–United States relations
 Kingdom of Württemberg–United States relations

References

United States
Bilateral relations of the United States
Germany–United States relations